Ethel Evelyn Duffy Turner (1885 San Pablo – 1969 Cuernavaca) was an American journalist and writer. She was a witness to the events of the Mexican Revolution. She is known for her book Ricardo Flores Magón and the Mexican Liberal Party.

Career 
In 1909, she wrote for The Border,  in Tucson, financed by Elizabeth Trowbridge. Under the guise of a magazine dedicated to the border culture of Arizona, it also campaigned in defense of the Mexican Liberal Party (PLM) members imprisoned in the United States. It also campaigned against  the social situation in Mexico during the regime. by Porfirio Díaz.

Duffy Turner was an anarchist. She helped organize the Magonista party in Los Angeles. She knew Antonio Villa-Real, Librado Rivera.  Magonist meetings were held at the Turners' own Los Angeles apartment. She edited the Regeneration English pages.

Her papers are held at the University of California, Berkeley.

Personal life 
She married John Kenneth Turner in 1905 in Fresno, CA. They met at the University of California, where Ethel was a 3rd year student, and John was a "special student".  They had a daughter in 1909 named Juanita.  Ethel and John divorced in 1917, and Ethel never remarried.

Works 
 Ethel Duffy Turner; Eduardo Limón G Ricardo Flores Magón y el Partido Liberal Mexicano Morelia: Editorial Erandi del Gobierno del Estado, 1960
 Ethel Duffy Turner; Rey Devis Revolution in Baja California: Ricardo Flores Magon's High Noon Detroit, Mich. : Blaine Ethridge—Books, 1981. 
Ethel Duffy Turner; One Way Ticket , Published by Smiths & Haas, January 1934

References

External links 
 Writers and Revolutionists: An Interview Conducted by Ruth Teiser, 1967
 Audio from oral history interview, 1966

1969 deaths
1885 births
American women journalists
American writers
American anarchists
Anarcho-communists